Lamanna (or LaManna) is an Italian surname. Notable people with the surname include:

César Lamanna (born 1987), Argentine footballer
Eugenio Lamanna (born 1989), Italian footballer
Franco Lamanna (born 1991), Uruguayan rugby union player
Girolamo Lamanna (1580–1640), Italian painter
Humberto Bruni Lamanna (born 1957), Venezuelan classical guitarist
Matt Lamanna, American paleontologist
Ross LaManna, American screenwriter and author
Santiago Lamanna (born 1992), Uruguayan footballer
Stefan Lamanna (born 1995), Canadian soccer player

Italian-language surnames